OOS or Oos may refer to:

Geographical names
 Oos, Baden-Württemberg, district in Germany
 Oos (river), a river of Baden-Württemberg, Germany, running through Baden-Baden

Science and industry
 Otdel Opytnogo Samolyetostroeniya (Russian) - a section for experimental aircraft construction and maker of the OOS Aviatourist
 Object-oriented scanning, a measurement method
 Occupational overuse syndrome, a human disorder
 Out Of Sample, testing performed to validate results in an experiment
 Out Of Scope, project management
 Out of specification
 Out of Office Soon

 Oxford Ornithological Society

Publications and media
 The Legend of Zelda: Oracle of Seasons, a video game
 Out of Sync (book), a 2007 autobiography of Lance Bass
 Origin of Symmetry, a 2001 album by Muse
 Out of Sight, a 1998 movie with Jennifer Lopez and George Clooney
 OxygenOS, version of the Android mobile operating system developed by Chinese smartphone manufacturer OnePlus.

Other uses
 Out Of Service
 Out Of State (Student)
 Out Of Stock or Stockout (sales)
 Order Of Shadow (Community)

See also
 OO (disambiguation)
 00s (disambiguation)